Pool C of the 2011 Rugby World Cup began on 11 September 2011 and was completed on 2 October. The pool was composed of Australia, Ireland, Italy, Russia and the United States. While history would suggest Pool C as a predictable in outcome, this was not the case. A shock win by the Irish over Australia saw Australia finish second in the pool stage for the second time, the first being in 1995 after the loss to the hosts South Africa.

Overall

All times are local New Zealand time (UTC+12 until 24 September, UTC+13 from 25 September)

Australia v Italy

Ireland v United States

Russia v United States

Australia v Ireland

Italy v Russia

Australia v United States

Ireland v Russia

Italy v United States

Australia v Russia

Ireland v Italy

References

External links
Pool C at rugbyworldcup.com

Pool C
2010–11 in Irish rugby union
2010–11 in Italian rugby union
2011 in Australian rugby union
2011 in American rugby union
2011 in Russian rugby union